Sortie is the sixth album by soprano saxophonist Steve Lacy and was recorded in Italy in 1966 and released on the GTA label. It features six tunes written by Lacy and performed by Lacy, Enrico Rava, Aldo Romano and Kent Carter. The photo shown here is from the German edition on Polydor, which uses entirely different cover art.

Track listing
 "Sortie" - 12:00
 "Black Elk" - 10:00
 "Helmy" - 2:20
 "Fork New York" - 14:00
 "Living T. Blues" - 3:40
 "2-Fou" - 0:03

All compositions by Steve Lacy
Recorded in Milan, Italy on February 7, 1966

Personnel
Steve Lacy - soprano saxophone
Enrico Rava - trumpet (except on 3)
Aldo Romano - drums
Kent Carter - bass

References

1966 albums
Steve Lacy (saxophonist) albums